Kagalaska Island is an island in the Andreanof Islands of the Aleutian Islands of Alaska.

The island is covered in scrub brush and sand dunes, unlike other Alaskan islands that have hardscrabble coasts. It provides nesting grounds for sea birds and in the summer is a basking site for seals.

References

Andreanof Islands
Islands of Alaska
Islands of Unorganized Borough, Alaska